Djayusman Triasdi is an Indonesian former footballer who plays as a defender.

References

External links 
 

Indonesian footballers
Living people
1987 births
Sportspeople from Makassar
PSM Makassar players
Persebaya Surabaya players
Persisam Putra Samarinda players
Persela Lamongan players
Borneo F.C. players
PS Mojokerto Putra players
Liga 1 (Indonesia) players
Liga 2 (Indonesia) players
Indonesia youth international footballers
Association football defenders